The women's snowboard slalom competition at the 2017 Asian Winter Games in Sapporo, Japan was held on 20 February at the Sapporo Teine.

Schedule
All times are Japan Standard Time (UTC+09:00)

Results

References

External links
Results at FIS website

Women's Slalom